Howard Charles Warrender Nicholls (2 June 1931 – 2 March 2011) was a Welsh rugby union player who at club level represented Maesteg, Bridgend and Cardiff. He gained just a single cap for Wales, awarded for facing Ireland in the 1958 Five Nations Championship.

Personal history
Nicholls was born in Maesteg in 1931, and attended Maesteg Grammar, who he represented on the rugby field. He later attended Hereford Cathedral School, and played in the same school cricket team as future England international Peter Richardson. After leaving school, Nicholls returned to Wales, to begin a career with Lloyd's Bank. He later left banking to take over the family butchers from his father, Percy. He moved to Porthcawl in 1963 after marrying Jill Jones, whose father was ex-Wales international rugby player Arthur Hugh Jones. The couple had four children.

A keen amateur photographer and birdwatcher, Nicholls was often published in various birding magazines. He died at Danygraig Care Home in Porthcawl in 2011, having survived his wife.

Rugby career
Nicholls played rugby for both Maesteg Grammar and Hereford Cathedral School and continued to play rugby on his return to Wales, firstly for Maesteg Celtic before switching to Maesteg. Nicholls also turned out for Bridgend before, in the 1952-53 season, switching to first-class team Cardiff. Nicholls spent seven seasons with Cardiff, playing in 150 senior games. In 1958 he was selected for his one and only Wales cap, in that year's Five Nations Championship encounter with Ireland.

Notes

Bibliography
 
 

1931 births
2011 deaths
Bridgend RFC players
Cardiff RFC players
Maesteg RFC players
People educated at Hereford Cathedral School
Rugby union players from Maesteg
Rugby union wings
Wales international rugby union players
Welsh rugby union players